Pharsatikar (named Suddodhan in 2018) is a Rural municipality in Rupandehi District, Lumbini Province of southern Nepal. At the time of the 2011 Nepal census it had a population of 9,663 people living in 1992 individual households. Before some years, people here used to be mostly Tharus but due to, the huge agricultural possibility and a very good environment that it serves to the people staying here, its population has found to be increased with mostly people shifted here from Myanmar in late 80's along with Paharis migrating from the neighbouring districts.

Education
Pharsatikar is an educational hub of nearby areas. Educational quality is gradually increasing in recent years. Some education institutions are
 Tillottama English Secondary School
 Dream Vision School
 Little Flower English Boarding School
 Siddhartha English Secondary School
 Pharsatikar Secondary School

Transport
 Bicycles and Motorbikes are the common means of transport in Pharsatikar. Ricksaw are available for short distance travel while Buses and jeeps are available for Butwal in hourly basis. One Bus departs for Kathmandu via Pharsatikar in daily basis.

Economy
 Main market remains closed every Friday. There are two fairs held every week, one on Tuesday and other on Saturday. Banks available for banking services are :
 *NIC ASIA
 *Nepal Community Bank
 *Shine Resunga Development Bank
 *NMB bank Limited               agricultural development bank

Places of Interest
Siyabar
Lumbini
Murgiya
Darbaha 
Naryanapur
Tinau River
Bethani- A beautiful and clean village
Parroha Parmeshower Bolbam Dham

References

Populated places in Rupandehi District